Glagolitic Supplement is a Unicode block containing supplementary characters used in the Glagolitic script.  It currently contains 38 combining letters.

Block

History
The following Unicode-related documents record the purpose and process of defining specific characters in the Glagolitic Supplement block:

References 

Unicode blocks